The 1975–76 Hong Kong First Division League season was the 65th since its establishment.

League table

References
1975–76 Hong Kong First Division table (RSSSF)

Hong
Hong Kong First Division League seasons
football